Sheikh Ali bin Abdullah Al Mualla was Ruler of Umm Al Quwain from 1853–1873, one of the Trucial States which today form the United Arab Emirates (UAE).

The date of commencement of his rule is uncertain, but it has generally been accepted as starting the year his father, Abdullah, signed the 1853 Perpetual Maritime Truce. Ali ratified the 1856 'Further engagement for the suppression of the slave trade' as well as, in 1864, a treaty underwriting the protection of the British telegraph line and stations.

Ali bin Abdullah presided over a largely peaceful period in Umm Al Quwain's often turbulent history, even resisting imprecations from Thuwaini bin Said, Sultan of Muscat and Oman, who wanted to ally Abu Dhabi and Umm Al Quwain against Sultan bin Saqr of Sharjah (who had earned himself a rebuke from the British over his intrigues against Thuwaini). This policy endured even when other Trucial leaders gave their support to Thuwaini, the Battle of Dhank in October 1870 ranged Abu Dhabi, Dubai, Ajman and Ras Al Khaimah – as well as the Bani Qitab and Na'im, with the Sultan, but not Umm Al Quwain.

Having led a peaceful life, he died a peaceful death in 1873 and was succeeded by his younger brother, Ahmad bin Abdullah Al Mualla.

References 

1873 deaths
Year of birth missing
Sheikhs of Umm Al Quwain
History of the United Arab Emirates
19th-century Arabs